Marichgan (also Romanized as Marīchgān and Marīchkān; also known as Mīr Bajgān, Marjekān, Merījgān, and Mirījgān) is a village in Radkan Rural District, in the Central District of Chenaran County, Razavi Khorasan Province, Iran. At the 2006 census, its population was 198, in 51 families.

References 

Populated places in Chenaran County